The 2017 South Carolina Gamecocks football team represented the University of South Carolina in the 2017 NCAA Division I FBS football season. The Gamecocks played their home games at Williams-Brice Stadium in Columbia, South Carolina and competed in the East Division of the Southeastern Conference (SEC). They were led by second-year head coach Will Muschamp. They finished the season 9–4, 5–3 in SEC play to finish in second place in the East Division. They were invited to the Outback Bowl, where they defeated Michigan.

2017 recruiting class

Schedule
South Carolina announced its 2017 football schedule on September 13, 2016. The 2017 schedule consists of 7 home games, 4 away, and 1 neutral site game in the regular season. The Gamecocks hosted SEC foes Arkansas, Florida, Kentucky, and Vanderbilt, and traveled to Georgia, Missouri, Tennessee, and Texas A&M.

The Gamecocks hosted three of its four non–conference games which are against Clemson from the Atlantic Coast Conference (ACC), Louisiana Tech from Conference USA and Wofford from the Southern Conference and travel to Charlotte, North Carolina for the Belk Kickoff against NC State from the ACC.

Schedule Source:

Roster

Rankings

References

South Carolina
South Carolina Gamecocks football seasons
ReliaQuest Bowl champion seasons
South Carolina Gamecocks football